Fru is a puzzle-platform game developed by Through Games. Fru was released for the Xbox One console on 13 July 2016.

Gameplay
Fru is a puzzle platform video game, in which players control a young girl wearing a fox mask through a 2-dimensional environment. The game makes use of the Kinect motion sensing peripheral. The player's silhouette is projected in real-time onto the scenery to manipulate and reveal hidden platforms.

Development and release
Fru was developed and published by Through Games. A prototype was created as an entry for the 2014 Global Game Jam. In March 2014, Microsoft announced at GDC that Fru would be releasing on the Xbox One video game console via their ID@Xbox program. Through Games founder, Mattia Traverso, expressed disappointment at Microsoft's decision to start selling Xbox One consoles without the Kinect device, questioning whether completing the product would be financially viable. Fru was released on 13 July 2016.

Reception

Fru received generally positive reviews from critics.

References

External links
 

2016 video games
Game jam video games
Kinect games
Puzzle-platform games
Video games about children
Video games about foxes
Video games featuring female protagonists
Video games developed in the Netherlands
Xbox One games
Xbox One-only games